Costermano sul Garda is a comune (municipality) in the Province of Verona in the Italian region Veneto, located about  west of Venice and about  northwest of Verona.

Costermano sul Garda borders the following municipalities: Affi, Bardolino, Caprino Veronese, Garda, Rivoli Veronese, San Zeno di Montagna, and Torri del Benaco.

Twin towns
 Oberndorf am Lech, Germany, since 1989

References

External links
 Official website

Cities and towns in Veneto